Simulium fibrinflatum, the inflated gnat, is a species of black flies, insects in the family Simuliidae.

References

Simulium
Articles created by Qbugbot
Insects described in 1936